Alderman George Ennis (born 9 February 1953) is a former Northern Irish Unionist politician who was a Democratic Unionist Party (DUP) Member of the Northern Ireland Assembly (MLA) for  Strangford from 2003 to 2007.

Ennis was first elected to Ards (borough) in 1993 and was Mayor of Ards in 1998–1999.

Ennis was elected to the Northern Ireland Assembly in 2003 for the constituency of Strangford for the DUP.

In February 2007, Ennis defected from the DUP to the UK Unionist Party (UKUP). He stood for the Strangford seat on a UKUP ticket but lost his seat. Following the demise of UKUP, Ennis sat as an independent councillor in Ards before joining the Traditional Unionist Voice (TUV) on 15 September 2009.

He is Vice Chair of the Northern Ireland Building Regulations Council, a board member of SEELB and Chair of the Northern Ireland Strategic Waste Partnership.

Ennis is a member of the Greenwell Street Presbyterian Church.

References

External links
 NI Assembly profile
 Strategem profile

1953 births
Living people
People from County Down
Democratic Unionist Party MLAs
Northern Ireland MLAs 2003–2007
UK Unionist Party politicians
Members of Ards Borough Council
Presbyterians from Northern Ireland
Traditional Unionist Voice politicians